The women's tournament of water polo at the 2015 Pan American Games in Toronto, Canada took place between the 7 and 15 of July at the Markham Pan Am Centre in Markham, Ontario. The first through fourth-place finishing teams qualified for the 2016 Women's Water Polo Olympic Games Qualification Tournament to be held in Gouda, Netherlands.

Qualification
A National Olympic Committee may enter one women's team for the water polo competition. Canada, the host nation along with seven other countries qualified through regional competitions.

Format
 Eight teams are split into 2 preliminary round groups of 4 teams each. The top 2 teams from each group qualify for the knockout stage.
 The third and fourth placed each group will crossover and play each other in the fifth to eighth place bracket.
 In the semifinals, the matchups are as follows: A1 vs. B2 and B1 vs. A2
 The winning teams from the semifinals play for the gold medal. The losing teams compete for the bronze medal.

Preliminary round
All times are local Eastern Daylight Time (UTC−5)

Group A

Group B

Classification stage

Bracket

Fifth to Eighth place

Seventh place match

Fifth place match

Medal round

Bracket

Semifinals

Bronze medal match

Gold medal match

Final standings

References

External links
Tournament draw and schedule

Water polo at the 2015 Pan American Games
Women's water polo in Canada
2015 in women's water polo